Yawi may mean:

 Yawi language, a Malayan language of Southern Thailand
 Jawi script, an Arabic alphabet used for several languages of Southeast Asia

See also 
 Yaoi, a Japanese genre of fiction